Silver Threads Among the Gold	is a 1911 film directed by Edwin S. Porter and adapted by Porter from a story Pierce Kingsley. It is among the first early silent films about a song, where exhibitors would hire live musicians to accompany the film. The film centers on a performance of the popular song Silver Threads Among the Gold.

Cast
Mabel Trunnelle	
Robert Brower
William Bechtel

References

External links

1911 films
Films based on songs
Films directed by Edwin S. Porter
1911 drama films
American silent short films
American black-and-white films
Silent American drama films
1910s American films